Milk is a 2021 Russian comedy-drama film directed by Karen Oganesyan. It was theatrically released on September 23, 2021 by Sony Pictures Productions and Releasing (SPPR).

Plot 
The film takes place in the beautiful city of Kirovsk, Murmansk Oblast, where an ordinary girl Zoya lives, who, thanks to the northern lights, gains the ability to change the fate of people.

Cast

References 

2021 films
2021 comedy-drama films
2020s Russian-language films
Russian comedy-drama films